Kleve (traditional   ; ; ; ; ; Low Rhenish: Kleff) is a town in the Lower Rhine region of northwestern Germany near the Dutch border and the River Rhine. From the 11th century onwards, Cleves was capital of a county and later a duchy. Today, Cleves is the capital of the district of Cleves in the German state of North Rhine-Westphalia. The city is home to one of the campuses of the Rhine-Waal University of Applied Sciences.

Territory of the municipality 
In addition to the inner city, the territory of Kleve comprises fourteen villages and populated places:
Bimmen, Brienen, Donsbrüggen, Düffelward, Griethausen, Keeken, Kellen, Materborn, Reichswalde, Rindern, Salmorth, Schenkenschanz, Warbeyen and Wardhausen.

History
The name Kleff probably derives from Middle Dutch clef, clif 'cliff, bluff', referring to the promontory on which the Schwanenburg castle was constructed. Since the city's coat of arms displays three clover leaves (German Klee, Low German Kliev), the city's name is sometimes linked by folk etymology to the clover, but the corresponding Dutch word is klaver. 

The Schwanenburg Castle, which was the residence of the Dukes of Cleves, stands on a steep hill. It is located at the northern terminus of the Kermisdahl where it joins with the Spoykanal, which was previously an important transportation link to the Rhine.

Medieval Kleve grew together from four parts – the Schwanenburg Castle, the village below the castle, the first city of Kleve on Heideberg Hill, and the Neustadt ("New City"), dating from the 14th century. In 1242 Kleve received city rights. The Duchy of Cleves, which roughly covered today's districts of Kleve, Wesel and Duisburg, was united with the Duchy of Mark in 1368, was made a duchy itself in 1417, then united with the neighboring duchies of Jülich and Berg in 1521, when John III, Duke of Cleves, married Mary, heiress of Jülich-Berg-Ravenburg.

Kleve's most famous native was Anne of Cleves (1515–1557), daughter of John III, Duke of Cleves and (briefly) the fourth wife of Henry VIII of England. Several local businesses are named after her, including the Anne von Kleve Galerie.

 
The ducal dynasty became extinct in the male line in 1609, leading to a succession crisis in the duchies: the War of the Jülich Succession (1609–1614). After the Thirty Years' War ended in 1648, the succession dispute was resolved with Cleves passing to the elector of Brandenburg, thus becoming an exclave of the Margraviate of Brandenburg, later Brandenburg-Prussia.

During the Thirty Years' War the city had been under the control of the Dutch Republic, which in 1647 had given Johann Moritz von Nassau-Siegen administrative control over the city. He approved a renovation of Schwanenburg Castle in the baroque style and commissioned the construction of extensive gardens that greatly influenced European landscape design. Significant amounts of his original plan for Kleve were put into effect and have been maintained to the present, a particularly well-loved example of which is the Forstgarten (Forest Garden). In 1701, Cleves became part of the Kingdom of Prussia.

During the War of the First Coalition, Cleves was captured by French Revolutionary troops on 19 October 1794. In 1795 it was incorporated into the Roer department, which became part of the Cisrhenian Republic in 1797, which in turn was formally annexed by the French First Republic in 1802, becoming the French First Empire in 1804. Prussia retrieved the city in 1815.

The mineral waters of Kleve and the wooded parkland surrounding it made it a fashionable spa in the 19th century. At this time, Kleve was named "Bad Cleve" (English: Spa of Cleves). It was not until 1935 when the German spelling of its name was officially changed from Cleve to Kleve.

During World War II Kleve was the site of one of the two radio wave stations that served the Knickebein aircraft navigation system. Luftwaffe bombers used radio beams from Kleve and a second station at Stolberg to navigate to British targets. The Knickebein system was eventually jammed by the British. It was replaced by the higher frequency X-Gerät system, which used transmitter stations located on the channel coast of France.

Kleve was heavily bombed during the Second World War, and over 90% of buildings in the city were severely damaged. Most of the destruction was the result of a raid late in the war in 1945, conducted at the request of Lieutenant-General Brian Horrocks in preparation for Operation Veritable. Horrocks recounted his decision in the 1973 television documentary The World at War:
"Then they came to me and they said, 'Do you want the town of Cleves taken out?' By 'taken out' they meant the whole of the heavy bombers putting on to Cleves. Now, I knew that Cleves was a very fine old historical German town. Anne of Cleves, one of Henry VIII's wives, came from there. I knew that there were a lot of civilians in Cleves, men, women and children. If I said no, they would live. If I said yes, they would die. A terrible decision you’ve got to take. But... everything depended on getting a high piece of ground at Materborn. The German reserves would have to come through Cleves, and we would have to breach the Siegfried Line and get there. And your own lives, your own troops, must come first, so I said yes, I did want it taken out. But when all those bombers went over, the night just before zero hour, to take out Cleves, I felt a murderer. And after the war I had an awful lot of nightmares, but always Cleves."

Horrocks later said that this had been "the most terrible decision I had ever taken in my life" and that he felt "physically sick" when he saw the bombers overhead.

As a result of the bombing, relatively little of the pre-1945 city remains. Those structures spared include a number of historic villas built during the heyday of the spa Bad Kleve, located along the B9 near the Tiergarten. Of those buildings destroyed, many were reconstructed, including most of the Schwanenburg and the Stiftskirche, the Catholic parish church. Constructed on high ground, many of these landmarks can be seen from the surrounding communities.

Since 1953 there has been a broadcasting facility for FM radio and television from regional broadcaster WDR near Kleve. The current aerial mast was brought into service in 1993. The steel tube mast rises 126.4 metres high and has a diameter of 1.6 metres. It is stabilized by guy wires attached at 57 and 101.6 metres height.

After the Second World War important employers in the area were associated with the West German "Economic Miracle" (Wirtschaftswunder), and included the XOX Bisquitfabrik (XOX Biscuit Factory) GmbH and the Van den Berg'schen Margerinewerke (Van den Berg’s Margarine Factory). Another important employer was the Elefanten-Kinderschuhfabrik (Elefant Children's Shoe Factory).

Retail became an increasingly important industry, particularly after the institution of the euro in 2002. Dutch citizens often crossed the open border to patronize Kleves retailers, and much of the euros spent on shopping in Kleve came from the Netherlands. Lower costs of real estate have attracted a wave of Dutch citizens, who purchased houses in the area.

Demographics

Census data
According to the Statistical Yearbook of Cleves as of 2013, 50,650 people resided in the city. The population density was 517.9 people per square kilometer. 86.7% of the residents had the German citizenship (including residents with dual citizenship) and 10.1% another EU citizenship (5.6% Dutch and 2.9% Polish).
 
In the city, in 2013, the population was distributed with 19.7% under the age of 21, 25.6% from 21 to 40, 29.7% from 41 to 60, 20.1% from 61 to 80, and 4.9% who were 81 years of age or older. For every 100 females, there were 96.7 males. For every 100 females age 21 and over, there were 93.9 males.

81.3 of the citizens lived in households without children under the age of 18, 9.2% with one child, 6.1% with two children, 1.7% with three children, and 0.1% with four children or more.

Religion
Like the rest of the Lower Rhine region, Kleve is a predominantly Roman Catholic city. The city is part of the Diocese of Münster. 61.1% of the residents are Roman Catholics, 14.4% Protestant, and 24.6% "Other". The largest section of this group are residents without any religious affiliation, but there are also sizeable Russian Orthodox and Muslim communities in Kleve.

The fifty killed Jewish citizens of Cleves are remembered with signs that tell their names, and dates and places of death.

In 1767 the town was at the center of a controversy between prominent European rabbis, known as "The Kleve Divorce", over the legality of a divorce granted by a groom whose sanity was in doubt.

Gallery

Government

City Council 
Prior to the Nazi Era, Kleve's local politics were dominated by the Catholic Centre Party. This situation continued with the Christian Democratic successor party CDU after the Second World War, in spite of resettled displaced people from eastern Germany, most of them Protestants. Until 2004 the CDU controlled an absolute majority of the city council.

Today, Kleve is governed by a coalition of CDU and the Green Party. Since the last local elections on 25 May 2014 the following parties are represented in Cleves' city council. In addition to nationwide parties,  (Open Cleves) has a number of seats.

The next local elections are scheduled for 2020.

Mayor
In 2015, Sonja Northing (no party affiliation) became mayor of Kleve, with 64.5% of the vote. Her candidacy was supported by the SPD and FDP, and opposed by CDU and Green Party candidates. Northing was the first mayor of Cleves since World War I who was not a CDU member. In 2020 Wolfgang Gebing (CDU) was elected mayor.

Language and dialect 
The native language of Kleve and much of the Lower Rhine region is a Dutch dialect known as Cleverlander (Dutch: Kleverlands, German: Kleverländisch), most closely related to South Guelderish, but the official language is German, which is dominant among the younger generation.

Because of its geographical location at the Dutch-German border, there is a strong overlap in culture and language. One example of this is Govert Flinck (1615 – 1660), who though born in Kleve established himself as a Dutch artist. On the other hand, the Dutch artist Barend Cornelis Koekkoek (1803 – 1862) settled in Kleve and became a successful landscape painter. His works are collected by and exhibited in the local museum Haus Koekkoek for his and others' romantic paintings.

Twin towns – sister cities

Kleve is twinned with:
 Ameland, Netherlands
 Fitchburg, United States
 Ronse, Belgium
 Worcester, England, United Kingdom

Notable people
Marie of Cleves, Duchess of Orléans (1426–1487), mother of king Louis XII of France
Johannes von Soest (1448–1506), medieval musician, music theorist, poet, and composer
Duke Englebert of Cleves (1462–1506), Count of Nevers
Anne of Cleves (1515–1557), fourth wife of Henry VIII of England
Marie Eleonore of Cleves (1550–1608), Duchess Consort of Prussia
Govaert Flinck (1615–1660), Dutch painter, worked in Kleve
Anacharsis Cloots (1755–1794), nobleman, politician and French revolutionary
Heinrich Vohs (c. 1763–1804), actor and singer
Joachim Murat (1767–1815), Grand Duke of Grand Duchy of Berg during the Napoleonic years
Heinrich Berghaus (1797–1884), cartographer
Joseph Beuys (1921–1986), artist, grew up in Kleve
Karl Leisner (1915–1945), Roman Catholic martyr and beatified by Pope John Paul II, grew up in Kleve
Willi Lippens (born 1945), footballer
Jürgen Möllemann (1945–2003), politician (FDP), Federal Minister
Barbara Hendricks (born 1952), politician (SPD), Federal Minister
Klaus Steinbach (born 1953), swimmer, president of the German Olympic Sports Confederation in 2002–2006
Tina Theune (born 1953), football coach

See also
 Get of Cleves
Kleve transmitter

References

External links 

  
 Tourist Information 
 Edicts of Jülich, Cleves, Berg, Grand Duchy Berg, 1475-1815 (Coll. Scotti) online
 Settlement of Dortmund between Brandenburg and Palatinate-Neuburg and the conflict of succession in Jülich, in full text

 
Towns in North Rhine-Westphalia
Kleve (district)
Holocaust locations in Germany